Events from the year 1832 in Denmark.

Incumbents
 Monarch – Frederick VI
 Prime minister – Otto Joachim

Events

 5 September – an ordinance requires workers to carry a Skudsmålsbog as record of their employment.

Births
 11 February – Thomas Skat Rørdam, theologian and bishop (died 1909)
 26 April – Carl Ludvig Gerlach, composer and opera singer (died 1893)
 14 October – Fanny Suenssen, author (died 1918)
 21 October – Valdemar Tofte, violinist (died 1907)

Deaths
 15 February – Hardenack Otto Conrad Zinck, composer (born 1746)
 26 February – Peter Schousboe, botanist (born 1766) 
 12 March – Friedrich Kuhlau, composer (born 1786 in Germany)
 6 October – Juliane Marie Jessen, author and translator (born 1760) 
 14 November
 Wilhelm Bendz, painter (born 1804)
 Rasmus Christian Rask, scholar and philologist (born 1787)

References

 
1830s in Denmark
Denmark
Years of the 19th century in Denmark